is a train station in the village of Yugawa, Kawanuma District, Fukushima Prefecture, Japan.

Lines

Station layout
The station consists of one side platform serving a single bi-directional track. The station is unattended. There is no station building, but only a prefabricated shelter on the platform.

History
The station opened on 1 November 1934. With the privatization of Japanese National Railways (JNR) on 1 April 1987, the station came under the control of JR East.

Surrounding area
Oikawa Elementary School

See also
 List of railway stations in Japan

External links

 JR East station information 

Railway stations in Fukushima Prefecture
Ban'etsu West Line
Railway stations in Japan opened in 1934
Yugawa, Fukushima